The Adina Mosque is a former mosque in Malda District, West Bengal, India. It was the largest such structure in the Indian subcontinent and was built during the Bengal Sultanate as a royal mosque by Sikandar Shah, who is also buried inside.  The mosque is situated in Pandua, a former royal capital.

The vast architecture is associated with the hypostyle of the Umayyad Mosque, which was used during the introduction of Islam in new areas. The early Bengal Sultanate harbored imperial ambitions after having defeated the Delhi Sultanate twice in 1353 and 1359. The Adina Mosque was commissioned in 1373. Its construction reused extra materials from pre-Islamic Hindu and Buddhist structures.

According to the List of Monuments of National Importance in West Bengal (serial no. N-WB-81) Adina Mosque is an ASI listed monument.

Design

The design of the mosque incorporated Bengali, Arab, Persian and Byzantine architecture. Although the mosque is eye-catching from far because of its size, but because of the finely precise executed designed decoration makes it hard to see the characteristics it holds without standing in a good distance from it. It was built with rubble masonry that was covered with brick, stone, coatings of stucco, plaster, concrete, glazing or lime smoothing. Stone flowers were integrated into the arches of the interior and exterior all around the building. Its plan is similar to the Great Mosque of Damascus. It had a rectangular hypostyle structure with an open courtyard. There were several hundred domes. The structure measured 172 by 97 m. The entire western wall evokes the imperial style of pre-Islamic Sasanian Persia. The mosque's most prominent feature is its monumental ribbed barrel vault over the central nave, the first such huge vault built in the subcontinent, and another feature shared in common with the Sassanian style. The mosque consciously imitated Persianate imperial grandeur. The prayer hall is five aisles deep, while the north, south and east cloisters around the courtyard consist of triple aisles. In total, these aisles had 260 pillars and 387 domed bays. The interior of the courtyard is a continuous façade of 92 arches surmounted by a parapet, beyond which the domes of the bays can be seen. The ornament on the building is simple, but if you look closer you can see the intensity and disciple in the engravings that have been created on the walls and arches. The interior elevated platform, which was the gallery of the Sultan and his officials, still exists. The Sultan's tomb chamber is attached with the western wall.

History

Accounts of Pandua
The mosque was built during the reign of Sikandar Shah, the second Sultan of the Ilyas Shahi dynasty of the Bengal Sultanate. The mosque was designed to display the kingdom's imperial ambitions after its two victories against the Delhi Sultanate in the 14th century. Cut off from both north India and the Middle East in the late 8th/14th and early 9th/15th centuries, Muslim Bengali monarchs enthusiastically looked far to the west for cultural inspiration. Thus, for example, the inscription on the Ādīna Mosque describes Sultan Sekandar as “the exalted Sultan, the wisest, the most just, the most liberal and most perfect of the Sultans of Arabia and Persia (ʿArab o ʿAjam)” (S. Ahmed, p. 38). A few parts of the mosque's exterior wall have carvings like elephants and dancing figures. Inscriptions on the mosque proclaimed Sikandar Shah as "the exalted Sultan" and the "Caliph of the faithful". The Sultan was buried in a tomb chamber attached to the wall facing the direction of Mecca.

The mosque was located in the historic city of Pandua, a former capital of the Bengal Sultanate. Pandua was a thriving and cosmopolitan trading center during the period of the sultanate.

Modern era
The mosque was damaged by earthquakes in the 19th century. It fell into disuse. Much of Pandua also became part of the wilderness.

Gallery

See also
Bengali architecture
Islamic architecture
Baro Shona Masjid

References

Mosques in West Bengal
Monuments of National Importance in West Bengal
Archaeological sites in West Bengal
Maldah
Former mosques in India
Bengal Sultanate mosques
Mosques completed in 1375
Adina
Tourist attractions in Malda district